Planalto Central Aerodrome  is a brazilian airport in the administrative region of São Sebastião, in the Federal District, dedicated to general aviation. It is managed by contract by Infracea.

History
Previously known as Botelho Aerodrome, between September 11, 2019 and September 7, 2022 it was managed by contract by Infraero on behalf of the owner of the land, Terracap. On that day Infracea became the new contractor.

Airlines and destinations
No scheduled flights operate at this airport.

Access

See also

List of airports in Brazil

References

External links

Airports in Federal District (Brazil)
Transport in Brasília